The 2014–15 Women's EHF Challenge Cup was the 18th edition of the European Handball Federation's fourth-tier competition for men's handball clubs, running from 14 November 2014 to 13 May 2015.

Overview

Team allocation
The labels in the parentheses show how each team qualified for the place of its starting round:
TH: Title holders
2nd, 3rd, 4th, 5th, 6th, etc.: League position

Round and draw dates
All draws held at the European Handball Federation headquarters in Vienna, Austria.

Qualification stage

Round 3
Teams listed first played the first leg at home. Some teams agreed to play both matches in the same venue. Bolded teams qualified into last 16.

|}
Notes

a Both legs were hosted by Naisa Niš.
b Both legs were hosted by Ardeşen GSK.
c Both legs were hosted by Colégio de Gaia.
d Both legs were hosted by Fram.
e Both legs were hosted by Crvena zvezda.

f Both legs were hosted by JAC-Alcanena.
g Both legs were hosted by Amyntas Amyntaiou.
h Both legs were hosted by Sokol Poruba.
i Both legs were hosted by Knjaz Miloš.

Knockout stage

Last 16

Seedings

Matches
Teams listed first played the first leg at home. Some teams agreed to play both matches in the same venue. Bolded teams qualified into quarter finals.

|}
Notes

a Both legs were hosted by JAC-Alcanena.
b Both legs were hosted by Knjaz Miloš.
c Both legs were hosted by Naisa Niš.
d Both legs were hosted by Ardeşen GSK.

e Both legs were hosted by Mios Biganos.
f Both legs were hosted by Le Havre.
g Both legs were hosted by Colégio de Gaia.

Quarter-final
Teams listed first played the first leg at home. Some teams agreed to play both matches in the same venue. Bolded teams qualified into semi finals.

|}
Notes

a Both legs were hosted by Ardeşen GSK.

b Both legs were hosted by Galytchanka.

Semi-finals
Teams listed first played the first leg at home. Some teams agreed to play both matches in the same venue. Bolded teams qualified into the Finals.

Final
Team listed first played the first leg at home.

|}

See also
2014–15 Women's EHF Champions League
2014–15 Women's EHF Cup Winners' Cup
2014–15 Women's EHF Cup

References

External links
Women's EHF Challenge Cup (official website)

Women's EHF Challenge Cup
EHF Challenge Cup
EHF Challenge Cup